Goritsa may refer to:

 Goritsa, Burgas Province
 Goritsa, Dobrich Province
 Goritsa, Targovishte Province
 Goritsa, Varna Province
 Goritsa (Greece), an archaeological site at Volos.
 Goritsa Rocks, two contiguous rocks in Zed Islands in the South Shetland Islands